Brokenhead Ojibway Nation (BON, meaning at the brokenhead River) is an Anishinaabe (Saulteaux/Ojibwa) First Nation located approximately  northeast of Winnipeg, Manitoba.

The main reserve of Brokenhead 4 is surrounded by the Rural Municipality of St. Clements, except for a small lakeshore on Lake Winnipeg.

Reserves
The First Nation have reserved for themselves three reserves:

Brokenhead 4 

Brokenhead 4 serves as the main reserve of Brokenhead Ojibway Nation.

It contains the settlement of Scanterbury, Manitoba, as well as part of the Netley Creek Marsh area. Within Scanterbury is South Beach Casino, which is owned by the several First Nations of the Southeast Resource Development Council (including BON).

The Brokenhead River runs through the core area of the community, while both PTH 59 and the CN Rail line cross through the northwest portion of the reserve.

Governance
Brokenhead Ojibway Nation is governed by the Act Electoral System of government.  The current leadership is Chief Gordon Bluesky and Councillors Allen (Sam) Hocaluk, Christopher Kent, Wendell Sinclair Jr (Ogimma)and Remi Olson. The Chief's and Councillors' two-year elected term began on April 18, 2022 and will conclude in April 2024. Brokenhead Ojibway Nation is a member of the Southeast Resource Development Council and a signatory to Treaty 1.

References

External links
 
 AANDC profile
 Southeast Community Futures Development Corporation profile
 Map of Brokenhead 4 at Statcan

Southeast Resource Development Council
First Nations in Eastman Region, Manitoba
First Nations governments in Manitoba
Saulteaux